License to Drive is a 1988 American teen comedy film written by Neil Tolkin and directed by Greg Beeman in his feature film directorial debut. It stars Corey Haim, Corey Feldman, Heather Graham, Carol Kane, Richard Masur, Michael Manasseri, and Nina Siemaszko.

The film was in production in late 1987. It was released on July 6, 1988, in the United States and grossed over $20 million at the North American box office. It was distributed by 20th Century Fox.

Plot
Southern California teenager Les Anderson tries to get his driver's license in order to impress his crush, beautiful Mercedes Lane. He fails the knowledge portion of the exam, but inadvertently causes a computer surge.

Les' failing marks are thought to be irretrievable, but the Department of Motor Vehicles lets him pass the exam after comparing him to his twin sister's high marks. He eventually passes the road test, but his real test scores are finally retrieved and his license is revoked.

Les tries concealing the truth from his parents, but his mother finds out the truth and his father grounds him for two weeks. Les had previously made plans to drive his grandfather's prized 1972 Cadillac Sedan de Ville and decides to sneak away anyway for a joyride with Mercedes.

Mercedes gets drunk and then she and Les accidentally cave in the hood of the car after dancing on it. She passes out; Les panics and goes to his best friend Dean's house to have him fix the dent in the car's hood.

Dean persuades Les to continue the joyride along with their friend Charles, but are unaware Les still does not have his license. The three put Mercedes in the trunk of the car and continue their night on the town, causing even more damage to the Cadillac. Meanwhile, Mrs. Anderson wakes up her husband late in the night announcing she is in labor.

The next day, Les drops off Charles and Dean at their homes. Mercedes wakes up and believes that the night prior was a dream. Les drops her off at her house where they share a kiss. Les gets in trouble with his father Robert after returning home with the  damaged Cadillac.

Mrs. Anderson is still in labor, but since the car's transmission will not shift into drive he is forced to drive his family to the hospital in reverse. She is taken into the hospital but a crane fails outside and a falling steel girder crushes the Cadillac, much to the shock of Les and Robert.

The family tries to explain the state of the Cadillac to Les' grandfather, but Grandpa laughs it off as he reveals he has severely damaged his son's own BMW in an accident. Robert gives the BMW to Les and jokingly tells him to take good care of it.

Although Les thanks his father, he has changed his mind and doesn't want it anymore. Mercedes pulls up in a white Volkswagen Golf Cabriolet and picks up Les, who gets in the driver's seat and drives away with her.

Cast

Release
It earned $22,433,275 at the North American box office, against a production budget of $8 million.

Reception
License to Drive received generally negative reviews from critics. The site's critics consensus reads, "Despite a hard-working cast and a premise that will appeal to its teenage target demographic, this deeply silly comedy only has a License to Drive audiences to seek out better films." On Metacritic, the film had an average score of 36 out of 100 based on 9 critics, indicating "Generally unfavorable reviews." Chicago Sun-Times critic Roger Ebert gave the film two and a half out of four stars and described the film as "more-than-passable summer entertainment, especially when it identifies with the yearnings of its young heroes to get behind the wheel." He said the first half of the film was "very funny" but the second half was "much more predictable".

Music
 Track listing

 "Drive My Car" by Breakfast Club – 3:13
 "Sweet Surrender" by Brenda K. Starr – 4:50
 "I Feel Free" (extended version) by Belinda Carlisle – 6:55
 "Time Starts Now" by Boys Club – 4:28
 "Get Outta My Dreams, Get into My Car" by Billy Ocean – 4:43
 "Crucial" by New Edition – 4:30
 "One More Dance" by Jonathan Butler – 4:32
 "Jazzy's in the House" by DJ Jazzy Jeff & The Fresh Prince – 2:55
 "Touch and Go" by Femme Fatale – 3:57
 "Make Some Noise" by Slave Raider – 3:28

Songs played in the film, but not on the soundtrack
 "Mercedes Boy" by Pebbles – 3:54 (single remix)
 "Rush Hour" by Jane Wiedlin – 4:03
 "Strangers in the Night" by Frank Sinatra
 "That's Life" by Frank Sinatra
 "Waiting for the Big One" by Femme Fatale
 "Trouble" by Nia Peeples

Home media
License to Drive was first released on VHS by CBS/Fox Video in late 1988. It was notable that some VHS versions of the film replaced the Nia Peeples song "Trouble" with "New Sensation" by INXS.

A special edition DVD was distributed by Anchor Bay Entertainment in the United States on May 3, 2005. Special features included interviews with Corey Haim and Corey Feldman, audio commentary with Greg Beeman and Neil Tolkin, deleted scenes, TV spots, theatrical trailers, and the film's screenplay (DVD-ROM).

On January 17, 2012, Anchor Bay released the film on Blu-ray.

Unmade sequel and trilogy
In an interview on Larry King Live, on March 10, 2010, the day of Corey Haim's death, Corey Feldman revealed that he and Haim had been developing a sequel, titled License to Fly, an idea initiated by Haim. Feldman also stated that there were tentative plans for a trilogy, with a third installment called License to Dive.

Reboot
As of 2017, Fox Studios and Davis Entertainment were developing a female-driven reboot based on the film.

See also
 List of American films of 1988

References

External links
 
 
 

1988 films
1988 comedy films
1988 directorial debut films
1980s teen comedy films
American teen comedy films
Davis Entertainment films
Films about automobiles
Films directed by Greg Beeman
Films produced by John Davis
Films set in California
Films shot in California
1980s English-language films
1980s American films
20th Century Fox films